Cirupitty Wyravanathar Thamotharampillai (Pillai) (12 September 1832 – 1 January 1901)), sometimes referred to by the initials as C. Y., devoted his energies to the work of editing and publishing some of the oldest works of classical Tamil poetry and grammar. According to Kamil Zvelebil, he was the first person to be "engaged in the rediscovery of the earliest classical literature" of Tamil, and that his "greatness and merits have never been acknowledged".

Early life 
Thamotharampillai  was born to the couple of Vairavanathapillai and Perundevi. He chose to learn Tamil grammar and English at an early age. He studied science at the renowned Vaddukottai Seminary in Jaffna at the age of twelve. After that, In 1852 he worked sometime as a teacher in a School at Kopay, Ayalur. His son Alakasundaram is also a Tamil scholar.

Graduation 
After finishing his college education in 1852 at Batticotta Seminary, Thamotharampillai taught for some years under  the  mission  and  then  proceeded  to  Madras  to  head  a  mission-run daily. There he converted to Saivism, and wishing to keep his initials C. W., took on the name Cirupitty Wyravanathar Thamotharampillai. In 1858 he became the first student in the state to appear for the first Bachelor of Arts (B.A.) degree examination conducted by the University of Chennai. He later became the headmaster of Tamil Nadu Kallikottai Government College. He then became an auditor on the Government Accounts Department and later as the attorney.

Editor 
In 1853, he came to Chennai to become editor of the Tamil Nadu Daily Gazette run by Rev. Peter Percival, owner of the Wesleyan English School in Jaffna. He also worked as a Tamil Pandit in the Rajasthani College.

Pioneer in Publishing 
In 1853 he published a Tamil book on ethics entitled 'Needhi Neri Vilakkam', which not only sparked his interest in the field of book publishing, but also earned him the title of 'pioneer of Tamil publishing'.

Manuscript Recovery 
Jaffna born Pillai was the earliest scholar to systematically hunt for long-lost manuscripts and publish them using modern tools of textual criticism.  These included:

 Viracoliyam (1881)
 Iraiyanar Akapporul (1883)
 Tolkappiyam-Porulatikaram (1885)
 Kalittokai (1887) - the first of the Eight Anthologies (Eṭṭuttokai).

Pillai, along with his contemporaries such as U. V. Swaminatha Iyer, was responsible for collecting and cataloguing numerous old Sangam manuscripts and preparing them into compilations and modern form.

Both Iyer and Pillai printed and published Tholkappiyam, Nachinarkiniyar urai (1895), Tholkappiyam Senavariyar urai, (1868), Manimekalai (1898), Cilappatikaram (1889), Pattupattu (1889), and Purananuru (1894), all with scholarly commentaries. Between them, they published more 100 works in all, including minor poems.

Rao Bahadur Award 
He continued to study law, and in 1871 received the 'B.L.'. After passing the examination, he worked as a lawyer in Kumbakonam and in 1884 he was appointed as a Judge of the Pudukottai High Court. In 1895, after his retirement of about six years, the government conferred the title of 'Rao Bahadur' on Damodaram Pillai.

Death 
At the age of sixty-nine, Thamotharampillai died on January 1, 1901 (March 18, 1901) in the Purasaiwakkam of Chennai

Memorials 
Statue of Thamotharampillai established at the Kopay Christian College where he studied

Bibliography 
List of books published and written by C. W. Thamotharampillai:

Published texts 

C. W. Thamotharampillai published a number of ancient literature. Some of them are:

 Neethi Neri Vilakkam
 Cēṉāvaraiyar solladhikaaraththirku seaavaraiyar urai (1868)
 Veerasoozhiyam (1881)
 Irayanar Agaporul
 Kalitogai
 Tolkaappiya Poruladhikaarathirkaana nachinaarkiniyarurai
 Thirutanigai Puranam
 Ilakkana Vilakkam
 Soolamani
 Tolkaappiya ezhuthadhikaarathirkaana nachchinaarkkiniyanurai

Composed texts 

 Kattalai Kalithurai
 Saiva magathuvam
 Vacaṉa cūḷāmaṇi
 Natchathira Maalai
 Aaraam vaasaga puththagam
 Ezhaam vaasaga puththagam
 Aadhiyaagama keerththanam
 Viviliya virodham
 Gaandhamalar alladhu karpin maatchi (novel)

Books about him 
Thamotharampillai's History, D.A. Rajaratnam Pillai, Published by: n. Munisami Mudaliar, 'Ananda Bodhini', Madras, 1934

References

External links
C. W. Thamotharampillai who edited and published the oldest works of Tamil poetry. News7 Tamil.

1832 births
1901 deaths
Sri Lankan Hindu revivalists
Sri Lankan Tamil revivalists
Sri Lankan Tamil writers
Rai Bahadurs